Wilkowa may refer to the following places in Poland:
Wilkowa, Lower Silesian Voivodeship (south-west Poland)
Wilkowa, Świętokrzyskie Voivodeship (south-central Poland)